Fair and Warmer! is a 1957 studio album by June Christy. The songs were arranged by Pete Rugolo, and players on the record include trumpeter Don Fagerquist, trombonist Frank Rosolino, altoist Bud Shank, and tenor saxophonist Bob Cooper (who was also Christy's husband); none of the notable musicians were credited in the album's brief liner notes. The record peaked at #16 on the Billboard Pop Music Charts.

Fair and Warmer! was repackaged on a 2-albums-on-1-CD release along with her record Gone for the Day.

Track listing 

"I Want to Be Happy" (Vincent Youmans, Irving Caesar) - 1:21
"Imagination" (Jimmy Van Heusen, Johnny Burke) - 3:14
"I've Never Been in Love Before" (Frank Loesser) - 1:51
"Irresistible You" (Don Raye, Gene De Paul) - 2:38
"No More" (Bob Russell, Toots Camarata) - 3:00
"Better Luck Next Time" (Irving Berlin) - 1:43
"Let There Be Love" (Lionel Rand, Ian Grant) - 1:54
"When Sunny Gets Blue" (Jack Segal, Marvin Fisher) - 2:56
"The Best Thing for You" (Berlin) - 2:14		 
"Beware My Heart" (Sam Coslow) 3:12
"I Know Why (And So Do You)" (Harry Warren, Mack Gordon) - 2:10
"It's Always You" (Van Heusen, Burke) - 2:52

Personnel 

 June Christy – vocals
 Pete Rugolo – arranger, conductor
 Don Fagerquist – trumpet
 Frank Rosolino – trombone
 Vincent DeRosa – French horn
 Clarence Karella – tuba
 Bud Shank – alto saxophone, flute
 Bob Cooper – tenor saxophone
 Dave Pell – baritone saxophone
 Larry Bunker – vibraphone
 Howard Roberts – guitar
 Benny Aronov – piano
 Red Mitchell – bass
 Shelly Manne – drums

References

External links 
 [ Fair and Warmer!] at AllMusic

1956 albums
June Christy albums
Capitol Records albums
Albums arranged by Pete Rugolo